The 2014 Tajik Cup was the 23rd edition of the Tajik Cup. The cup winner qualified for the 2015 AFC Cup.

Preliminary round

Round of 16

Quarter-finals

Semi-finals

Final

References

External links
Tajikistan Football Federation

Tajikistan Cup
Tajikistan
Tajik Cup